Ocular is an adjective that refers to the eye, an organ of vision that detects light.

Ocular may also refer to:

 Eyepiece, the optical element closest to the eye in a telescope or microscope
 Ocular scales, a type of scales surrounding the eyes of scaled reptiles
 Formally known as Pass Portal, a type of password keeper